Vladimir Golemić (born 28 June 1991) is a Serbian professional footballer who plays as a centre-back for Italian Serie C club Crotone.

Club career
On 31 January 2022, Golemić returned to Crotone on a contract until 30 June 2022, with a conditional extension option based on performance.

Honours
Mladost Lučani
 Serbian First League: 2013–14

References

External links
 PrvaLiga profile
 
 
 

Association football defenders
Expatriate footballers in Germany
Expatriate footballers in Italy
Expatriate footballers in Slovenia
Expatriate footballers in Switzerland
FC Energie Cottbus II players
FC Lugano players
FK Mladost Lučani players
NK Šampion players
FC Chiasso players
F.C. Crotone players
Regionalliga players
Serbian expatriate footballers
Serbian expatriate sportspeople in Germany
Serbian expatriate sportspeople in Slovenia
Serbian expatriate sportspeople in Switzerland
Serbian First League players
Serbian footballers
Serbian SuperLiga players
Serie A players
Serie B players
Serie C players
Sportspeople from Kruševac
Swiss Challenge League players
Swiss Super League players
1991 births
Living people